Çamlıdere is a village in Toroslar district of Mersin Province, Turkey, which is part of Greater Mersin. Çamlıdere lies along the highway which connects Mersin to Gözne and Arslanköy. The population of Çamlıdere is 126 as of 2012. At the west of the village, there is an animal house for the street dogs of Mersin.

References

Villages in Toroslar District